Thomas R. "Tank" Conrad was an American football player and coach. He served as the head football coach at Delaware State College—now known as Delaware State University—from 1943 to 1949 and Winston-Salem State University from 1950 to 1969. Jackson is the longest tenured head coach in the history of the Winston-Salem State Rams football program and its all-time leader in wins. He coached Delaware State's only bowl game win, a 7–6 Flower Bowl victory over Florida Normal and Industrial Institute.

Conrad attended Morgan College—now known as Morgan State University—where he played football and basketball and ran track.

Head coaching record

References

Year of birth missing
Year of death missing
American football halfbacks
Delaware State Hornets football coaches
Morgan State Bears football players
Morgan State Bears men's basketball players
Morgan State Bears men's track and field athletes
Winston-Salem State Rams football coaches
African-American coaches of American football
African-American players of American football
African-American basketball players
African-American male track and field athletes
20th-century African-American sportspeople